Herman "Ivory" Chittison (October 15, 1908 – March 8, 1967) was an American jazz pianist.

He was born in Flemingsburg, Kentucky, United States. Chittison began his career in Zack Whyte's territory band in Ohio in 1928. In the early 1930s,  he moved to New York and found work as an accompanist to Ethel Waters, Adelaide Hall, and Clarence Williams. He also visited Boston for the first time with a traveling show headlined by comic actor Stepin Fetchit. In late 1933, he went to Europe with the Willie Lewis Orchestra and toured Europe with them; the following year he recorded with Louis Armstrong in Paris. He and Bill Coleman led the Harlem Rhythm Makers. Herman Chittison and trumpeter Bill Coleman left Lewis in 1938 and formed a band that worked extensively in Cairo, Egypt, and traveled as far east as India. In October 1959, Chittison arrived in Boston and was employed as the resident pianist at the Red Garter bar in the Lenox Hotel. He then moved to the Mayfair Lounge in Bay Village. His stay in Boston lasted two years. Chittison had a reoccurring role as the piano player in the Blue Note Bar on the radio series, Casey, Crime Photographer.

Herman Chittison died in March 1967, at the age of 58.

References

American jazz pianists
American male pianists
People from Flemingsburg, Kentucky
1908 births
1967 deaths
Jazz musicians from Kentucky
20th-century American pianists
20th-century American male musicians
American male jazz musicians